Barsinella is a genus of moths in the subfamily Arctiinae. The genus was erected by Arthur Gardiner Butler in 1878.

Species
 Barsinella asuroides
 Barsinella desetta
 Barsinella mirabilis

References

Gibeaux, C. (1983). "Description de nouvelles Lithosiinae de la Guyana Française (Lepidoptera: Arctiidae)". Annales de la Société Entomologique de France. 19 (1): 69–78.

External links

Lithosiini
Moth genera